

Bandy
 January 9 – 13: 2018 Women's Bandy World Championship in  Chengde
  defeated , 1–0, to win their second consecutive and eighth overall Women's Bandy World Championship title.
  took third place.
 January 26 – 28: 2018 Bandy World Championship Y-19 in  Drammen
  defeated , 6–3, to win their 8th Bandy World Championship Y-19 title.
  took third place.
 January 26 – 28: 2018 Youth Bandy World Championship (Y15 category) in  Minneapolis
 January 28 – February 4: 2018 Bandy World Championship Division B in  Harbin
 The  defeated , 3–2, in the final.
  took third place.
 January 29 – February 4: 2018 Bandy World Championship Division A in  Khabarovsk
  defeated , 5–4, to win their 11th Bandy World Championship title.
  took third place.
 February 9 – 11: 2018 Youth Bandy World Championship (Y17 category) in  Ulyanovsk
 March 22 – 24: 2018 Bandy World Championship Y-15 in 
 March 22 – 24: 2018 Bandy World Championship Y-17 in  Ulyanovsk

Bobsleigh & skeleton

2018 Winter Olympics (Bobsleigh & skeleton)
 February 15 – 17: Skeleton at the 2018 Winter Olympics in  Pyeongchang
 Men's winners:   Yun Sung-bin;   Nikita Tregubov;   Dominic Parsons
 Women's winners:   Lizzy Yarnold;   Jacqueline Lölling;   Laura Deas
 February 18 – 25: Bobsleigh at the 2018 Winter Olympics in  Pyeongchang
 Two-man bobsleigh winners:   (Justin Kripps & Alexander Kopacz);   (Francesco Friedrich & Thorsten Margis);   (Oskars Melbārdis & Jānis Strenga)
 Note: No silver medal was awarded here, due to a tie for first place, after all bobsleigh runs were completed.
 Four-man bobsleigh winners:  ;  ;  
 Note: No bronze medal was awarded here, due to a tie for second place, after all bobsleigh runs were completed.
 Women's bobsleigh winners:   (Mariama Jamanka & Lisa Buckwitz);   (Elana Meyers & Lauren Gibbs);   (Kaillie Humphries & Phylicia George)

International bobsleigh & skeleton events
 December 15 – 17, 2017: 2018 IBSF European Championships in  Innsbruck
 Two-man bobsleigh winners:  (Francesco Friedrich & Thorsten Margis)
 Four-man bobsleigh winners:  (Johannes Lochner, Marc Rademacher, Joshua Bluhm, & Christian Rasp)
 Women's bobsleigh winners:  (Stephanie Schneider & Annika Drazek)
 Skeleton winners:  Martins Dukurs (m) /  Elena Nikitina (f)
 January 19: 2018 IBSF Para European Championships in  Innsbruck
 Para-bobsleigh winner:  Alvils Brants
 January 25 – 28: 2018 IBSF Junior & U23 World Championships in  St. Moritz
 Junior two-man bobsleigh winners:  (Richard Oelsner & Alexander Schueller)
 Junior four-man bobsleigh winners:  (Pablo Nolte, Alexander Mair, Matthias Sommer, & Florian Bauer)
 Junior women's bobsleigh winners:  (Andreea Grecu & Costina Iusco Florentina)
 Junior Skeleton winners:  Nikita Tregubov (m) /  Anna Fernstaedt (f)
 Two-man U23 bobsleigh winners:  (Richard Oelsner & Alexander Schueller)
 Four-man U23 bobsleigh winners:  (Richard Oelsner, Benedikt Hertel, Alexander Schueller, & Paul Straub)
 Women's U23 bobsleigh winners:  (Laura Nolte & Lavinia Pittschaft)
 March 10 & 11: 2018 IBSF Para World Championships in  Lillehammer
 Para-bobsleigh winner:  Arturs Klots

2017–18 Bobsleigh World Cup & 2017–18 Skeleton World Cup
 November 5 – 10, 2017: B&SWC #1 in  Lake Placid, New York
 Two-man bobsleigh winners:  (Nico Walther & Christian Poser) (#1) /  (Codie Bascue & Samuel McGuffie) (#2)
 Women's bobsleigh winners:  (Kaillie Humphries & Melissa Lotholz)
 Skeleton winners:  Martins Dukurs (m) /  Janine Flock (f)
 November 13 – 18, 2017: B&SWC #2 in  Park City
 Four-man bobsleigh #1 winners:  (Nico Walther, Kevin Kuske, Christian Poser, & Eric Franke)
 Four-man bobsleigh #2 winners:  (Johannes Lochner, Marc Rademacher, Christopher Weber, & Christian Rasp)
 Women's bobsleigh winners:  (Jamie Greubel & Lauren Gibbs)
 Skeleton winners:  Yun Sung-bin (m) /  Elena Nikitina (f)
 November 20 – 25, 2017: B&SWC #3 in  Whistler, British Columbia
 Two-man bobsleigh winners:  (Christopher Spring & Neville Wright)
 Four-man bobsleigh winners:  (Alexander Kasjanov, Ilvir Huzin, Vasiliy Kondratenko, & Aleksei Pushkarev)
 Women's bobsleigh winners:  (Kaillie Humphries & Melissa Lotholz)
 Skeleton winners:  Yun Sung-bin (m) /  Jacqueline Lölling (f)
 December 4 – 10, 2017: B&SWC #4 in  Winterberg
 Two-man bobsleigh winners:  (Clemens Bracher & Michael Kuonen)
 Four-man bobsleigh winners:  (Johannes Lochner, Joshua Bluhm, Christopher Weber, & Christian Rasp)
 Women's bobsleigh winners:  (Stephanie Schneider & Lisa Buckwitz)
 Skeleton winners:  Yun Sung-bin (m) /  Jacqueline Lölling (f)
 December 11 – 17, 2017: B&SWC #5 in  Innsbruck
 Two-man bobsleigh winners:  (Francesco Friedrich & Thorsten Margis)
 Four-man bobsleigh winners:  (Johannes Lochner, Marc Rademacher, Joshua Bluhm, & Christian Rasp)
 Women's bobsleigh winners:  (Stephanie Schneider & Annika Drazek)
 Skeleton winners:  Martins Dukurs (m) /  Elena Nikitina (f)
 January 1 – 7: B&SWC #6 in  Altenberg, Saxony
 Two-man bobsleigh winners:  (Justin Kripps & Alexander Kopacz)
 Four-man bobsleigh winners:  (Nico Walther, Kevin Kuske, Christian Poser, & Eric Franke)
 Women's bobsleigh winners:  (Kaillie Humphries & Phylicia George)
 Skeleton winners:  Yun Sung-bin (m) /  Jacqueline Lölling (f)
 January 8 – 14: B&SWC #7 in  St. Moritz
 Two-man bobsleigh winners:  (Nico Walther & Christian Poser)
 Four-man bobsleigh winners:  (Johannes Lochner, Sebastian Mrowka, Joshua Bluhm, & Christian Rasp)
 Women's bobsleigh winners:  (Elana Meyers & Lolo Jones)
 Skeleton winners:  Yun Sung-bin (m) /  Janine Flock (f)
 January 15 – 21: B&SWC #8 (final) in  Schönau am Königsee
 Two-man bobsleigh winners:  (Francesco Friedrich & Thorsten Margis)
 Four-man bobsleigh winners:  (Nico Walther, Kevin Kuske, Alexander Rödiger, & Eric Franke)
 Women's bobsleigh winners:  (Stephanie Schneider & Annika Drazek)
 Skeleton winners:  Axel Jungk (m) /  Jacqueline Lölling (f)

2017–18 IBSF Intercontinental Cup
 November 4 & 5, 2017: SIC #1 in  Whistler
 Men's Skeleton winner:  Kilian von Schleinitz (2 times)
 Women's Skeleton winners:  Anna Fernstädt (#1) /  Lanette Prediger (#2)
 November 12 & 13, 2017: SIC #2 in  Calgary
 Men's Skeleton winner:  Felix Keisinger (2 times) 
 Women's Skeleton winner  Anna Fernstädt (2 times)
 January 4 & 5: SIC #3 in  St. Moritz
 Men's Skeleton winner:  Felix Keisinger (2 times)
 Women's Skeleton winners:  Janine Becker (#1) /  Katie Uhlaender (#2)
 January 12 & 13: SIC #4 (final) in  Altenberg
 Men's Skeleton winners:  Felix Keisinger (#1) /  Kilian Freiherr von Schleinitz (#2) 
 Women's Skeleton winner:  Sophia Griebel (2 times)

2017–18 IBSF North American Cup
 November 4 – 7, 2017: B&SNAC #1 in  Whistler
 Two-man bobsleigh winners:  (Suk Young-jin & JI Hoon) (#1) /  (Taylor Austin & Ryan Sommer) (#2)
 Four-man bobsleigh winners:  (Edson Bindilatti, Odirlei Pessoni, Edson Martins & Rafael Souza da Silva)
 Women's bobsleigh winners:  (KIM Yoo-ran & KIM Min-seong) (#1) /  (Julie Johnson & Alecia Beckford-Stewart) (#2)
 Skeleton #1 winners:  Joseph Luke Cecchini (m) /  Kelly Curtis (f)
 Skeleton #2 winners:  Katsuyuki Miyajima (m) /  Grace Dafoe (f)
 November 12 – 17, 2017: B&SNAC #2 in  Calgary
 Two-man bobsleigh winners:  (Geoffrey Gadbois & Nicholas Taylor) (#1) /  (Geoffrey Gadbois & Brent Fogt) (#2)
 Four-man bobsleigh winners:  (Geoffrey Gadbois, Nicholas Taylor, Brent Fogt, & Frank Delduca)
 Women's bobsleigh winners:  (YING Qing & HE Xinyi) (#1) /  (Kristi Koplin & Nicole Brundgardt) (#2)
 Men's skeleton winner:  JUNG Seung-gi (2 times)
 Women's skeleton winner:  Veronica Day (2 times)
 November 28 – December 1, 2017: B&SNAC #3 in  Park City
 Two-man bobsleigh winners:  (Nick Cunningham & Christopher Kinney) (#1) /  (Justin Olsen & Steven Langton) (#2)
 Four-man bobsleigh #1 winners:  (Justin Olsen, Evan Weinstock, Steven Langton, & Christopher Fogt)
 Four-man bobsleigh #2 winners:  (Nick Cunningham, Samuel Michener, Christopher Kinney, & Hakeem Abdul-Saboor)
 Women's bobsleigh winners:  (Elana Meyers & Briauna Jones) (#1) /  (Nicole Vogt & Maureen Ajoku) (#2)
 Men's Skeleton winner:  John Farrow (2 times)
 Women's Skeleton winners:  Lanette Prediger (#1) /  Sophia Jeong (#2)
 January 11 – 14: B&SNAC #4 (final) in  Lake Placid
 Two-man bobsleigh #1 winners:  (Geoffrey Gadbois & Brent Fogt)
 Two-man bobsleigh #2 winners:  (Geoffrey Gadbois & Frank Delduca)
 Four-man bobsleigh #1 winners:  (Nick Cunningham, Hakeem Abdul-Saboor, Christopher Kinney, & Samuel Michener)
 Four-man bobsleigh #2 winners:  (Hunter Church, Brent Fogt, Lou Moreira, & Samuel Michener)
 Women's bobsleigh #1 winners:  (Nicole Vogt & Nicole Brundgardt)
 Women's bobsleigh #2 winners:  (Kristi Koplin & Nicole Brundgardt)
 Skeleton #1 winners:  Austin Florian (m) /  Kelly Curtis (f)
 Skeleton #2 winners:  Joseph Luke Cecchini /  Kristen Hurley (f)

2017–18 IBSF Europe Cup
 November 11 & 12, 2017: B&SEC #1 in  Lillehammer
 Two-man bobsleigh winners:  (Clemens Bracher & Michael Kuonen) (2 times)
 Women's bobsleigh winners:  (Katrin Beierl & Jennifer Jantina Oluumi Desire Onasanya) (2 times)
 Men's Skeleton winners:  Craig Thompson (#1) /  Krists Netlaus (#2)
 Women's Skeleton winner:  Eleanor Furneaux (2 times)
 November 17 & 18, 2017: B&SEC #2 in  Winterberg #1
 Skeleton #1 winners:  Martin Rosenberger (m) /  Brogan Crowley (f)
 Skeleton #2 winners:  Fabian Küchler (m) /  Corinna Leipold (f)
 November 23 – 25, 2017: B&SEC #3 in  Altenberg #1
 Two-man bobsleigh winners:  (Christoph Hafer & Tobias Schneider) (#1) /  (Mateusz Luty & Krzysztof Tylkowski) (#2)
 Four-man bobsleigh winners:  (Markus Treichl, Markus Glueck, Angel Somov, & Ekemini Bassey)
 Women's bobsleigh winners:  (Christin Senkel & Franziska Bertels)
 December 1 – 3, 2017: B&SEC #4 in  Schönau am Königssee
 Two-man bobsleigh winners:  (Johannes Lochner & Joshua Bluhm)
 Four-man bobsleigh #1 winners:  (Pablo Nolte, Benedikt Hertel, Alexander Schueller, & Paul Straub)
 Four-man bobsleigh #2 winners:  (Christoph Hafer, Michael Salzer, Korbinian Reichenberger, & Tobias Schneider)
 Women's bobsleigh winners:  (Katrin Beierl & Jennifer Jantina Oluumi Desire Onasanya) (2 times)
 December 15 – 17, 2017: B&SEC #5 in  La Plagne
 Two-man bobsleigh winners:  (Christoph Hafer & Tobias Schneider)
 Four-man bobsleigh winners:  (Christoph Hafer, Michael Salzer, Korbinian Reichenberger, & Tobias Schneider) (2 times)
 Women's bobsleigh winners:  (Christin Senkel & Leonie Fiebig)
 Men's Skeleton winner:  Krists Netlaus (2 times)
 Women's Skeleton winners:  Eleanor Furneaux (#1) /  Alina Tararychenkova (#2)
 January 5 & 6: B&SEC #6 in  Innsbruck #1
 Two-man bobsleigh winners:  (Pablo Nolte & Florian Bauer)
 Four-man bobsleigh winners:  (Clemens Bracher, Fabio Badraun, Martin Meier, & Michael Kuonen)
 Women's bobsleigh winners:  (Christin Senkel & Lena Zelichowski)
 January 12: B&SEC #7 in  Altenberg #2
 Skeleton winners:  Martin Rosenberger (m) /  Susanne Kreher (f)
 January 12 – 14: B&SEC #8 in  Winterberg #2
 Two-man bobsleigh winners:  (Richard Oelsner & Alexander Schueller)
 Four-man bobsleigh winners:  (Richard Oelsner, Benedikt Hertel, Alexander Schueller, & Paul Straub) (2 times)
 Women's bobsleigh winners:  (Christin Senkel & Lena Zelichowski)
 January 19: B&SEC #9 (final) in  Innsbruck #2
 Skeleton winners:  Evgeniy Rukosuev (m) /  Alina Tararychenkova (f)

2017–18 IBSF Para World Cup
 November 23 & 24, 2017: PWC #1 in  Calgary
 Para bobsleigh winners:  Jason Sturm (#1) /  Annija Krumina (#2)
 December 1 & 2, 2017: PWC #2 in  Lake Placid
 Para bobsleigh winners:  Christopher Stewart (#1) /  Corie Mapp (#2) 
 January 18 & 19: PWC #3 in  Innsbruck
 Para bobsleigh winners:  Corie Mapp (#1) /  Alvils Brants (#2)
 January 25 & 26: PWC #4 in  Oberhof
 Para bobsleigh winner:  Corie Mapp (2 times)
 February 1 & 2: PWC #5 (final) in  St. Moritz
 Para bobsleigh winners:  Christopher Stewart (#1) /  Arturs Klots (#2)

Curling

2018 Winter Olympics and Paralympics (Curling)
 December 5 – 10, 2017: 2017 Olympic Qualification Event in  Plzeň
 February 8 – 25: Curling at the 2018 Winter Olympics
 Men's winners:   (Skip: John Shuster);   (Skip: Niklas Edin);   (Skip: Peter de Cruz)
 Women's winners:   (Skip: Anna Hasselborg);   (Skip: Kim Eun-jung);   (Skip: Satsuki Fujisawa)
 Mixed Doubles winners:   (Kaitlyn Lawes & John Morris);   (Jenny Perret & Martin Rios);   (Kristin Skaslien & Magnus Nedregotten)
 Note: Norway was given the bronze medal here, due to a doping offense by Alexander Krushelnitskiy. As the result, both Anastasia Bryzgalova and Krushelnitskiy has their medals taken away from them.
 March 10 – 17: Wheelchair curling at the 2018 Winter Paralympics
 Winners:   (Skip: Wang Haitao);   (Skip: Rune Lorentsen);   (Skip: Mark Ideson)

International curling championships
 October 6 – 14, 2017: 2017 World Mixed Curling Championship in  Champéry
  (Skip: Grant Hardie) defeated  (Skip: Trevor Bonot), 8–5, to win Scotland's first World Mixed Curling Championship title.
 The  (Skip: Jaroslav Vedral) took third place.
 November 2 – 9, 2017: 2017 Pacific-Asia Curling Championships in  Erina, New South Wales
 Men:  (Skip: Kim Chang-min) defeated  (Skip: Zou Dejia), 9–8, to win South Korea's third Men's Pacific-Asia Curling Championships title.
  (Skip: Yusuke Morozumi) took third place.
 Women:  (Skip: Kim Eun-jung) defeated  (Skip: Satsuki Fujisawa), 11–6, to win South Korea's second consecutive and fifth overall Women's Pacific-Asia Curling Championships title.
  (Skip: Jiang Yilun) took third place.
 November 17 – 25, 2017: 2017 European Curling Championships in  St. Gallen
 Men:  (Skip: Niklas Edin) defeated  (Skip: Kyle Smith), 10–5, to win Sweden's fourth consecutive and 11th overall Men's European Curling Championships title.
  (Skip: Peter de Cruz) took third place.
 Women:  (Skip: Eve Muirhead) defeated  (Skip: Anna Hasselborg), 6–3, to win Scotland's third Women's European Curling Championships title.
  (Skip: Diana Gaspari) took third place.
 March 3 – 10: 2018 World Junior Curling Championships in  Aberdeen
 Men:  (Skip: Tyler Tardi) defeated  (Skip: Ross Whyte), 6–5, to win Canada's 19th Men's World Junior Curling Championships title.
  (Skip: Jan Hess) took third place.
 Women:  (Skip: Kaitlyn Jones) defeated  (Skip: Isabella Wranå), 7–4, to win Canada's 12th Women's World Junior Curling Championships title.
  (Skip: WANG Zixin) took third place.
 March 17 – 25: 2018 Ford World Women's Curling Championship in  North Bay, Ontario
  (Skip: Jennifer Jones) defeated  (Skip: Anna Hasselborg), 7–6, to win Canada's second consecutive and 17th overall World Women's Curling Championship title.
  (Skip: Victoria Moiseeva) took third place.
 March 31 – April 8: 2018 World Men's Curling Championship in  Las Vegas
  (Skip: Niklas Edin) defeated  (Skip: Brad Gushue), 7–3, to win Sweden's eighth World Men's Curling Championship title.
  (Skip: Bruce Mouat) took third place.
 April 21 – 28: 2018 World Mixed Doubles and Senior Curling Championships in  Östersund
 Mixed Doubles:  (Sven Michel & Michèle Jäggi) defeated  (Daniil Goriachev & Maria Komarova), 9–6, to win Switzerland's second consecutive and seventh overall World Mixed Doubles Curling Championship title.
  (Kirk Muyres & Laura Crocker) took third place.
 Senior Men:  (Skip: Wade White) defeated  (Skip: Mats Wranå), 8–2, to win Canada's 10th Men's World Senior Curling Championships title.
  (Skip: Jeff Wright) took third place.
 Senior Women:  (Skip: Sherry Anderson) defeated  (Skip: Margie Smith), 5–4, to win Canada's second consecutive and 12th overall Women's World Senior Curling Championships title.
  (Skip: Dagmar Frei) took third place.

2017–18 Curling Canada season of champions
 November 6 – 12, 2017: 2017 Home Hardware Road to the Roar in  Summerside
 Men's "A" Side winner:  (Skip: John Morris)
 Men's "B" Side winner:  (Skip: Brendan Bottcher)
 Women's "A" Side winner:  (Skip: Krista McCarville)
 Women's "B" Side winner:  (Skip: Julie Tippin)
 Note: All winners here have qualified to compete at the 2017 Roar of the Rings tournament.
 December 2 – 10, 2017: 2017 Tim Hortons Roar of the Rings in  Ottawa
 Men:  (Skip: Kevin Koe) defeated  (Skip: Mike McEwen), 7–6.
 Women:  (Skip: Rachel Homan) defeated  (Skip: Chelsea Carey), 6–5.
 Note: Koe and Homan would represent Canada at the 2018 Winter Olympics in curling.
 January 2 – 7: 2018 Canad Inns Canadian Mixed Doubles Trials in  Portage la Prairie
  Kaitlyn Lawes and  John Morris defeated both  Valerie Sweeting and  Brad Gushue, 8–6.
 Note: Both Lawes and Morris would represent Canada at the 2018 Winter Olympics in mixed doubles curling.
 January 11 – 14: 2018 Continental Cup of Curling in  London, Ontario
 Team North America defeated Team World, 30.5–30 points, to win their third consecutive and ninth overall Continental Cup of Curling title.
 January 13 – 21: 2018 Canadian Junior Curling Championships in  Shawinigan
 Men:  (Skip: Tyler Tardi) defeated  (Skip: Tanner Horgan), 8–4, to win British Columbia's second consecutive and sixth overall Men's Canadian Junior Curling Championships title.
 Women:  (Skip: Kaitlyn Jones) defeated  (Skip: Laurie St-Georges), 5–3, to win Nova Scotia's fifth Women's Canadian Junior Curling Championships title.
 Note: Both Tardi and Jones would represent Canada at the 2018 World Junior Curling Championships.
 January 27 – February 4: 2018 Scotties Tournament of Hearts in  Penticton
  (Skip: Jennifer Jones) defeated  wildcard (Skip: Kerri Einarson), 8–6, to win Manitoba's ninth Scotties Tournament of Hearts title.
 Note: Jennifer Jones would represent Canada at the 2018 Ford World Women's Curling Championship.
 March 3 – 11: 2018 Tim Hortons Brier in  Regina
  (Skip: Brad Gushue) defeated  (Skip: Brendan Bottcher), 6–4, to win his second consecutive Tim Hortons Brier title. Also, Gushue defended his title as Team Canada, instead of representing Newfoundland and Labrador here.
 Note: Brad Gushue would represent Canada at the 2018 World Men's Curling Championship.

2017–18 World Curling Tour and Grand Slam of Curling
 August 3, 2017 – April 29, 2018: 2017–18 World Curling Tour and Grand Slam of Curling Seasons
 September 5 – 10, 2017: 2017 GSOC Tour Challenge in  Regina
 Men:  Brad Gushue (skip) defeated  Steffen Walstad (skip), 9–1, to win Newfoundland & Labrador's first Men's GSOC Tour Challenge title.
 Women:  Valerie Sweeting (skip) defeated  Anna Hasselborg (skip), 6–5, to win Alberta's second consecutive Women's GSOC Tour Challenge title.
 October 24 – 29, 2017: 2017 Masters of Curling in / Lloydminster
 Men:  Brad Gushue (skip) defeated  Niklas Edin (skip), 8–4, to win his second Masters of Curling title.
 Women:  Jennifer Jones (skip) defeated  Kerri Einarson (skip), 6–5, to win her first Masters of Curling title.
 November 14 – 19, 2017: 2017 Boost National in  Sault Ste. Marie, Ontario
 Men:  Bruce Mouat (skip) defeated  Kim Chang-min (skip), 9–4, to win Scotland's first Men's Boost National title.
 Women:  Jennifer Jones (skip) defeated  Casey Scheidegger (skip), 8–7, to win Manitoba's first Women's Boost National title.
 January 16 – 21: 2018 Meridian Canadian Open in  Camrose
 Men:  Peter de Cruz (skip) defeated  Niklas Edin (skip), 4–3, to win their first Men's Meridian Canadian Open title.
 Note: This men's event was the first time that a non-Canadian team has won this title.
 Women:  Chelsea Carey (skip) defeated  Michelle Englot (skip), 10–5, to win Alberta's second consecutive Women's Meridian Canadian Open title.
 March 16 – 19: 2018 Elite 10 (March) in  Port Hawkesbury
  Mike McEwen (skip) defeated  Brad Gushue (skip), 4–1, to win Manitoba's second Elite 10 title.
 April 10 – 15: 2018 Players' Championship in  Toronto
 Men:  Kevin Koe (skip) defeated  Niklas Edin (skip), 6–2, to win Alberta's 12th Men's Players' Championship title.
 Women:  Jamie Sinclair (skip) defeated  Jennifer Jones (skip), 7–2, to win United States' first Women's Players' Championship title.
 April 24 – 29: 2018 Humpty's Champions Cup in  Calgary
 Men:  Brad Gushue (skip) defeated  Glenn Howard (skip), 8–2, to win Newfoundland & Labrador's first Men's Humpty's Champions Cup title.
 Women:  Rachel Homan (skip) defeated  Kerri Einarson (skip), 7–6, to win Ontario's second consecutive Women's Humpty's Champions Cup title.

Figure skating

2018 Winter Olympics (Figure skating)
 February 9 – 23: Figure skating at the 2018 Winter Olympics in  Pyeongchang
 Men's winners:   Yuzuru Hanyu;   Shoma Uno;   Javier Fernández
 Ladies' winners:   Alina Zagitova;   Evgenia Medvedeva;   Kaetlyn Osmond
 Pairs winners:   (Aliona Savchenko & Bruno Massot);   (Sui Wenjing & Han Cong);   (Meagan Duhamel & Eric Radford)
 Ice dance winners:   (Tessa Virtue & Scott Moir) (World Record);   (Gabriella Papadakis & Guillaume Cizeron);   (Maia Shibutani & Alex Shibutani)
 Team winners:  ;  ;

International figure skating events
 January 15 – 21: 2018 European Figure Skating Championships in  Moscow
 Men's winner:  Javier Fernández
 Ladies' winner:  Alina Zagitova
 Pairs winners:  (Evgenia Tarasova & Vladimir Morozov)
 Ice dance winners:  (Gabriella Papadakis & Guillaume Cizeron)
 January 22 – 27: 2018 Four Continents Figure Skating Championships in  Taipei
 Men's winner:  Jin Boyang
 Ladies' winner:  Kaori Sakamoto
 Pairs winners:  (Tarah Kayne & Daniel O'Shea)
 Ice dance winners:  (Kaitlin Hawayek & Jean-Luc Baker)
 March 5 – 11: 2018 World Junior Figure Skating Championships in  Sofia
 Junior Men's winner:  Alexey Erokhov
 Junior Ladies' winner:  Alexandra Trusova
 Junior Pairs winners:  (Daria Pavliuchenko & Denis Khodykin)
 Junior Ice dance winners:  (Anastasia Skoptsova & Kirill Aleshin)
 March 19 – 25: 2018 World Figure Skating Championships in  Milan
 Men's winner:  Nathan Chen
 Ladies' winner:  Kaetlyn Osmond
 Pairs winners:  (Aliona Savchenko & Bruno Massot)
 Ice dance winners:  (Gabriella Papadakis & Guillaume Cizeron)

2017–18 ISU Grand Prix of Figure Skating
 October 20 – 22: 2017 Rostelecom Cup in  Moscow
 Men's winner:  Nathan Chen
 Ladies' winner:  Evgenia Medvedeva
 Pairs winners:  (Evgenia Tarasova & Vladimir Morozov)
 Ice dance winners:  (Maia Shibutani & Alex Shibutani)
 October 27 – 29: 2017 Skate Canada International in  Regina, Saskatchewan
 Men's winner:  Shoma Uno
 Ladies' winner:  Kaetlyn Osmond
 Pairs winners:  (Meagan Duhamel & Eric Radford)
 Ice dance winners:  (Tessa Virtue & Scott Moir)
 November 3 – 5: 2017 Cup of China in  Beijing
 Men's winner:  Mikhail Kolyada
 Ladies' winner:  Alina Zagitova
 Pairs winners:  (Sui Wenjing & Han Cong)
 Ice dance winners:  (Gabriella Papadakis & Guillaume Cizeron)
 November 10 – 12: 2017 NHK Trophy in  Osaka
 Men's winner:  Sergei Voronov
 Ladies' winner:  Evgenia Medvedeva
 Pairs winners:  (Sui Wenjing & Han Cong)
 Ice dance winners:  (Tessa Virtue & Scott Moir)
 November 17 – 19: 2017 Internationaux de France in  Grenoble
 Men's winner:  Javier Fernández
 Ladies' winner:  Alina Zagitova
 Pairs winners:  (Evgenia Tarasova & Vladimir Morozov)
 Ice dance winners:  (Gabriella Papadakis & Guillaume Cizeron)
 November 24 – 26: 2017 Skate America in  Lake Placid, New York
 Men's winner:  Nathan Chen
 Ladies' winner:  Satoko Miyahara
 Pairs winners:  (Aliona Savchenko & Bruno Massot)
 Ice dance winners:  (Maia Shibutani & Alex Shibutani)
 December 7 – 10: 2017–18 Grand Prix of Figure Skating Final in  Nagoya
 Men's winner:  Nathan Chen
 Ladies' winner:  Alina Zagitova
 Pairs winners:  (Aliona Savchenko & Bruno Massot)
 Ice dance winners:  (Gabriella Papadakis & Guillaume Cizeron)

2017–18 ISU Junior Grand Prix
 August 23 – 26: JGP #1 in  Brisbane
 Note: There was no junior pairs event here.
 Junior Men's winner:  Alexei Krasnozhon
 Junior Ladies' winner:  Alexandra Trusova
 Junior Ice Dance winners:  (Sofia Polishchuk & Alexander Vakhnov)
 August 31 – September 2: JGP #2 in  Salzburg
 Note: There was no junior pairs event here.
 Junior Men's winner:  Camden Pulkinen
 Junior Ladies' winner:  Anastasia Tarakanova
 Junior Ice Dance winners:  (Christina Carreira & Anthony Ponomarenko)
 September 6 – 9: JGP #3 in  Riga
 Junior Men's winner:  Mitsuki Sumoto
 Junior Ladies' winner:  Daria Panenkova
 Junior Pairs winners:  (Apollinariia Panfilova & Dmitry Rylov)
 Junior Ice Dance winners:  (Sofia Shevchenko & Igor Eremenko)
 September 20 – 24: JGP #4 in  Minsk
 Junior Men's winner:  Alexey Erokhov
 Junior Ladies' winner:  Alexandra Trusova
 Junior Pairs winners:  (Daria Pavliuchenko & Denis Khodykin)
 Junior Ice Dance winners:  (Christina Carreira & Anthony Ponomarenko)
 September 27 – 30: JGP #5 in  Zagreb
 Junior Men's winner:  Alexei Krasnozhon
 Junior Ladies' winner:  Sofia Samodurova
 Junior Pairs winners:  (Polina Kostiukovich & Dmitrii Ialin)
 Junior Ice Dance winners:  (Marjorie Lajoie & Zachary Lagha)
 October 4 – 7: JGP #6 in  Gdańsk
 Junior Men's winner:  Alexey Erokhov
 Junior Ladies' winner:  Alena Kostornaia
 Junior Pairs winners:  (Ekaterina Alexandrovskaya & Harley Windsor)
 Junior Ice Dance winners:  (Anastasia Skoptsova & Kirill Aleshin)
 October 11 – 14: JGP #7 in  Bolzano
 Note: There was no junior pairs event here.
 Junior Men's winner:  Matteo Rizzo
 Junior Ladies' winner:  Sofia Samodurova
 Junior Ice Dance winners:  (Arina Ushakova & Maxim Nekrasov)
 December 7 – 10: 2017–18 Grand Prix of Figure Skating Final in  Nagoya
 Junior Men's winner:  Alexei Krasnozhon
 Junior Ladies' winner:   Alexandra Trusova
 Junior Pairs winners:  (Ekaterina Alexandrovskaya & Harley Windsor)
 Junior Ice Dance winners:  (Anastasia Skoptsova & Kirill Aleshin)

Ice hockey

2018 Winter Olympics and Paralympics (Ice hockey)
 February 10 – 25: Ice hockey at the 2018 Winter Olympics in  Pyeongchang
 Men's tournament:   OAR;  ;  . The Olympic Athletes from Russia defeated Germany 4–3 in overtime, to win their first Olympic gold medal. Germany gets the silver medal. Canada defeated the Czech Republic 6–4, to win the bronze medal.
 Women's tournament:  ;  ;  . The United States defeated Canada 3–2 in shootout, to win their second Olympic gold medal. Canada gets the silver medal. Finland defeated the Olympic Athletes from Russia 3–2, to win the bronze medal.
 March 10 – 18: Para ice hockey at the 2018 Winter Paralympics in  Pyeongchang
  ;  ;  . The United States defeated Canada, 2–1, to win their third consecutive and fourth overall Para ice hockey Paralympic title. Canada won the silver medal. South Korea defeated , 1–0, to win the bronze medal.

Kontinental Hockey League
 August 21, 2017 – April 22, 2018: 2017–18 KHL season
 Gagarin Cup:  Ak Bars defeated fellow Russian team, CSKA Moscow, 4–1 in games played, to win their third Gagarin Cup title.

National Hockey League
 October 4, 2017 – April 8, 2018: 2017–18 NHL season
 Presidents' Trophy winners:  Nashville Predators
 Art Ross Trophy winner:  Connor McDavid ( Edmonton Oilers)
 December 16, 2017: NHL 100 Classic at TD Place Stadium in  Lansdowne Park, Ontario
 The  Ottawa Senators defeated the  Montreal Canadiens, 3–0.
 January 1: 2018 NHL Winter Classic at Citi Field in  Flushing, New York 
 The  New York Rangers defeated the  Buffalo Sabres, 3–2 in overtime.
 January 27 – 28: 63rd National Hockey League All-Star Game at Amalie Arena in  Tampa, Florida
 All-Star Game: The Pacific All-Stars defeated the Atlantic All-Stars, 5–2.
 All-Star MVP:  Brock Boeser ( Vancouver Canucks)
 Fastest Skater Winner:  Connor McDavid ( Edmonton Oilers)
 Passing Challenge Winner:  Alex Pietrangelo ( St. Louis Blues)
 Save Streak Winner:  Marc-André Fleury ( Vegas Golden Knights)
 Puck Control Relay Winner:  Johnny Gaudreau ( Calgary Flames)
 Hardest Shot Winner:  Alexander Ovechkin ( Washington Capitals)
 Accuracy Shooting Winner:  Brock Boeser ( Vancouver Canucks)
 March 3: 2018 NHL Stadium Series at Navy–Marine Corps Memorial Stadium in  Annapolis, Maryland
 The  Washington Capitals defeated the  Toronto Maple Leafs, 5–2.
 April 11 – June 7: 2018 Stanley Cup playoffs
 Eastern Conference Finals: The  Washington Capitals defeated the  Tampa Bay Lightning, 4–3 (in games series), to win their second Eastern Conference title.
 Western Conference Finals: The  Vegas Golden Knights defeated the  Winnipeg Jets, 4–1 (in games series), to win their first Western Conference title in their inaugural season.
 May 28 – June 7: 2018 Stanley Cup Finals
 The  Washington Capitals defeated the  Vegas Golden Knights, 4–1 in games played, to win their first Stanley Cup title.
 June 22 – 23: 2018 NHL Entry Draft at American Airlines Center in  Dallas, Texas
 #1:  Rasmus Dahlin (to the  Buffalo Sabres from the  Frölunda HC)

World ice hockey championships
 December 4 – 9, 2017, March 17 – 23 & April 7 – 13: 2018 IIHF Women's World Championship Division II in  Bled,  Valdemoro &  Sofia
 Division IIA: 1st:  (22nd overall); 2nd:  (23rd overall); 3rd:  (24th overall); 4th:  (25th overall); 5th:  (26th overall); 6th:  (27th overall).Note: The Netherlands promoted to the 2019 IIHF Women's World Championship Division I Group B.
 Division IIB: 1st:  (28th overall); 2nd:  (29th overall); 3rd:  (30th overall); 4th:  (31st overall); 5th:  (32nd overall); 6th:  (33rd overall).Note: Spain promoted to the 2019 IIHF Women's World Championship Division II Group A.
 Division IIBQ: 1st:  (34th overall); 2nd:  (35th overall); 3rd:  (36th overall); 4th:  (37th overall); 5th:  (38th overall).Note: Croatia promoted to the 2019 IIHF Women's World Championship Division II Group B.
 December 26, 2017 – January 5: 2018 World Junior Ice Hockey Championships in  Buffalo
  ;  ;  . Canada defeated Sweden 3–1, to win their 17th World Junior Ice Hockey Championship title. The United States won the bronze medal.
 January 6 – 13: 2018 IIHF World Women's U18 Championship in  Dmitrov
  ;  ;  . The United States defeated Sweden 9–3, to win their 7th IIHF World Women's U18 Championship title. Canada won the bronze medal.
 February 25 – 28 & April 16 – 22: 2018 IIHF World Championship Division III in  Cape Town &  Sarajevo
 Division III: 1st:  (41st overall); 2nd:  (42nd overall); 3rd:  (43rd overall); 4th:  (44th overall); 5th:  (45th overall); 6th:  (46th overall).Note 1: Georgia promoted to the 2019 IIHF World Championship Division II Group B.Note 2: Hong Kong relegated to the 2019 IIHF World Championship Division III Qualification.
 Division IIIQ: 1st:  (47th overall); 2nd:  (48th overall); 3rd:  (49th overall); 4th:  (50th overall).Note: Turkmenistan promoted to the 2019 IIHF World Championship Division III.
 April 8 – 14: 2018 IIHF Women's World Championship Division I in  Vaujany &  Asiago
 Division IA: 1st:  (10th overall); 2nd:  (11th overall); 3rd:  (12th overall); 4th:  (13th overall); 5th:  (14th overall); 6th:  (15th overall).Note: France promoted to the 2019 IIHF Women's World Championship Top Division.
 Division IB: 1st:  (16th overall); 2nd:  (17th overall); 3rd:  (18th overall); 4th:  (19th overall); 5th:  (20th overall); 6th:  (21st overall).Note: Italy promoted to the 2019 IIHF Women's World Championship Division I Group A.
 April 14 – 20 & 23 – 29: 2018 IIHF World Championship Division II in  Tilburg &  Granada
 Division IIB: 1st:  (35th overall); 2nd:  (36th overall); 3rd:  (37th overall); 4th:  (38th overall); 5th:  (39th overall); 6th:  (40th overall).Note 1: Spain promoted to the 2019 IIHF World Championship Division II Group A.Note 2: Luxembourg relegated to the 2019 IIHF World Championship Division III.
 April 19 – 29: 2018 IIHF World U18 Championships in  Chelyabinsk & Magnitogorsk
  ;  ;  . Finland defeated the United States, 3–2, to win their 4th IIHF World U18 Championship title. Sweden won the bronze medal.
 April 22 – 28: 2018 IIHF World Championship Division I in  Budapest &  Kaunas
 Division IA: 1st:  (17th overall); 2nd:  (18th overall); 3rd:  (19th overall); 4th:  (20th overall); 5th:  (21st overall); 6th:  (22nd overall).Note 1: Great Britain and Italy promoted to the 2019 IIHF World Championship Top Division.Note 2: Poland relegated to the 2019 IIHF World Championship Division I Group B.
 Division IB: 1st:  (23rd overall); 2nd:  (24th overall); 3rd:  (25th overall); 4th:  (26th overall); 5th:  (27th overall); 6th:  (28th overall).Note 1: Lithuania promoted to the 2019 IIHF World Championship Division I Group A.Note 2: Croatia relegated to the 2019 IIHF World Championship Division II Group A.
 May 4 – 20: 2018 IIHF World Championship in  Copenhagen & Herning
  ;  ;  . Sweden defeated Switzerland 3–2 in shootout, to win their second consecutive and 11th IIHF World Championship title. Switzerland gets the silver medal. The United States defeated Canada 4–1, to win the bronze medal.Note:  and  relegated to the 2019 IIHF World Championship Division I Group A.

Europe
IIHF Continental Cup
 September 29, 2017 – January 14, 2018: 2017–18 IIHF Continental Cup
 Champions:  Yunost Minsk; Runner-ups:  Nomad Astana; Third:  Sheffield Steelers; Fourth:  Ritten Sport.Note: Yunost Minsk has qualified to compete at the 2018–19 Champions Hockey League.

Champions Hockey League
 August 24, 2017 – February 6, 2018: 2017–18 Champions Hockey League
  JYP Jyväskylä defeated  Växjö Lakers, 2–0, to win their first Champions Hockey League title.

Asia
IIHF Challenge Cup of Asia
 December 12 – 17, 2017: 2018 IIHF U20 Challenge Cup of Asia in  Kuala Lumpur
  ;  ;  .
 March 6 – 9: 2018 IIHF Women's Challenge Cup of Asia Division I in  Kuala Lumpur
  ;  ;  .
 March 8 – 11: 2018 IIHF Women's Challenge Cup of Asia in  Kuala Lumpur
  ;  ;  .
 March 24 – 29: 2018 IIHF Challenge Cup of Asia Division I in  Kuala Lumpur
  ;  ;  .
 April 3 – 8: 2018 IIHF Challenge Cup of Asia in  Pasay, Metro Manila
  ;  ;  .

Asia League Ice Hockey
 September 2 – December 24, 2017: 2017–18 Asia League Ice Hockey season

North America

Junior
OHL/QMJHL/WHL
 September 21, 2017 – March 18: 2017–18 OHL season
 Eastern Conference title winners: Hamilton Bulldogs
 Western Conference title winners: Sault Ste. Marie Greyhounds
 March 22 – May 13: J. Ross Robertson Cup
 The Hamilton Bulldogs defeated the Sault Ste. Marie Greyhounds, 4–2 in games played, to win their first J. Ross Robertson Cup title.
 September 21, 2017 – March 18: 2017–18 QMJHL season
 West Division & Jean Rougeau Trophy winners:  Blainville-Boisbriand Armada
 East Division winners:  Rimouski Océanic
 Maritimes Division winners:  Acadie–Bathurst Titan
 March 22 – May 13: President's Cup
 The  Acadie–Bathurst Titan defeated the  Blainville-Boisbriand Armada, 4–2 in games played, to win their second President's Cup title.
 September 22, 2017 – March 18: 2017–18 WHL season
 East Division & Conference winners:  Moose Jaw Warriors
 Central Division winners:  Medicine Hat Tigers
 British Columbia Division winners:  Kelowna Rockets
 USA Division winners:  Everett Silvertips
 March 22 – May 13: Ed Chynoweth Cup
 The  Swift Current Broncos defeated the  Everett Silvertips, 4–2 in games played, to win their third Ed Chynoweth Cup title.
 May 18 – 27: 2018 Memorial Cup at Brandt Centre in  Regina, Saskatchewan
 The  Acadie–Bathurst Titan defeated the  Regina Pats, 3–0 , to win their first Memorial Cup title.

College
NCAA (Division I)
 March 10 – 18: 2018 NCAA National Collegiate Women's Ice Hockey Tournament (Frozen Four at Ridder Arena in  Minneapolis, Minnesota)
 The  Clarkson Golden Knights defeated the  Colgate Raiders, 2–1 in overtime, to win their second consecutive and third NCAA Division I Women's Ice Hockey national title.
 March 23 – April 7: 2018 NCAA Division I Men's Ice Hockey Tournament (Frozen Four at Xcel Energy Center in  St. Paul, Minnesota)
 The  Minnesota–Duluth Bulldogs defeated the  Notre Dame Fighting Irish, 2–1, to win their second NCAA Division I Men's Ice Hockey national title.

Women's
Clarkson Cup
 March 25: 2018 Clarkson Cup in  Toronto, Ontario
 The  Markham Thunder defeated the  Kunlun Red Star, 2–1 in overtime, to win their first Clarkson Cup title.

National Women's Hockey League
 March 25: 2018 Isobel Cup in  Newark, New Jersey
 The  Metropolitan Riveters defeated the  Buffalo Beauts, 1–0, to win their first Isobel Cup title.

Senior
Allan Cup
 April 9 – 14: 2018 Allan Cup in  Rosetown
 The  Stoney Creek Generals defeated the  Lacombe Generals, 7–4, to win their first Allan Cup title.

Other ice hockey tournaments
Development Cup
 September 30 – October 1, 2017: 2017 Development Cup in  Canillo
  ;  ;  . Morocco defeated Ireland, 11–4, to win their first Development Cup title.

Luge

2018 Winter Olympics (Luge)
 February 10 – 15: Luge at the 2018 Winter Olympics in  Pyeongchang
 Men's singles winners:   David Gleirscher;   Chris Mazdzer;   Johannes Ludwig
 Women's singles winners:   Natalie Geisenberger;   Dajana Eitberger;   Alex Gough
 Men's doubles winners:   (Tobias Wendl & Tobias Arlt);   (Peter Penz & Georg Fischler);   (Toni Eggert & Sascha Benecken)
 Team relay winners:  ;  ;

International luge events
 December 1, 2017: 2017 Asian Luge Championships in  Altenberg
 Men's singles:  Shiva Keshavan
 Women's singles:  Sung Eun-ryung
 Men's doubles:  (Park Jin-yong & Cho Jung-myung)
 December 8 & 9, 2017: 2017 America Pacific Luge Championships in  Calgary
 Men's singles:  Samuel Edney
 Women's singles:  Alex Gough
 Men's doubles:  (Tristan Walker & Justin Snith)
 January 20 & 21: 2018 Junior America-Pacific Championships in  Winterberg
 Junior Men's singles:  Nicholas Klimchuk-Brown
 Junior Women's singles:  Carolyn Maxwell
 Junior Men's doubles:  (Nicholas Klimchuk-Brown & Daniel Shippit Adam)
 January 20 & 21: 2018 Junior European Luge Championships in  Winterberg
 Junior Men's singles:  Max Langenhan
 Junior Women's singles:  Cheyenne Rosenthal
 Junior Men's doubles:  (Dmitriy Buchnev & Daniil Kilseev)
 February 2 & 3: 2018 Junior World Luge Championships in  Altenberg
 Junior Men's singles:  Max Langenhan
 Junior Women's singles:  Jessica Tiebel
 Junior Men's doubles:  (Ivan Nagler & Fabian Malleier)
 February 3 & 4: 2018 Junior World Natural Track Luge Championships in  Laas, South Tyrol
 Junior Men's singles:  Fabian Achenrainer
 Junior Women's singles:  Alexandra Pfattner
 Junior Men's doubles:  (Fabian Achenrainer & Miguel Brugger)
 February 9 – 11: 2018 FIL Natural Track European Luge Championships in  Obdach-Winterleiten
 Men's singles:  Thomas Kammerlander
 Women's singles:  Evelin Lanthaler
 Men's doubles:  (Patrick Pigneter & Florian Clara)

2017–18 Luge World Cup
 November 18 & 19, 2017: LWC #1 in  Innsbruck
 Men's singles:  Semen Pavlichenko
 Women's singles:  Natalie Geisenberger
 Men's doubles:  (Toni Eggert & Sascha Benecken)
 November 25 & 26, 2017: LWC #2 in  Winterberg
 Men's singles:  Kevin Fischnaller
 Women's singles:  Natalie Geisenberger
 Men's doubles:  (Toni Eggert & Sascha Benecken)
 December 2 & 3, 2017: LWC #3 in  Altenberg
 Men's singles:  Felix Loch
 Women's singles:  Natalie Geisenberger
 Men's doubles:  (Toni Eggert & Sascha Benecken)
 December 8 & 9, 2017: LWC #4 in  Calgary
 Men's singles:  Felix Loch
 Women's singles:  Tatjana Hüfner
 Men's doubles:  (Toni Eggert & Sascha Benecken)
 December 15 & 16, 2017: LWC #5 in  Lake Placid
 Men's singles:  Roman Repilov
 Women's singles:  Natalie Geisenberger
 Men's doubles:  (Toni Eggert & Sascha Benecken)
 January 6 & 7: LWC #6 in  Schönau am Königsee
 Men's singles:  Wolfgang Kindl
 Women's singles:  Natalie Geisenberger
 Men's doubles:  (Tobias Wendl & Tobias Arlt)
 January 13 & 14: LWC #7 in  Oberhof
 Men's singles:  Felix Loch
 Women's singles:  Dajana Eitberger
 Men's doubles:  (Toni Eggert & Sascha Benecken)
 January 20 & 21: LWC #8 in  Lillehammer
 Men's singles:  Dominik Fischnaller
 Women's singles:  Summer Britcher
 Men's doubles:  (Toni Eggert & Sascha Benecken)
 January 27 & 28: LWC #9 (final) in  Sigulda
 Men's singles:  Semen Pavlichenko
 Women's singles:  Tatiana Ivanova
 Men's doubles:  (Toni Eggert & Sascha Benecken)

2017–18 Team Relay Luge World Cup
 November 18 & 19, 2017: TRLWC #1 in  Innsbruck
 Winners:  (Natalie Geisenberger, Felix Loch, Toni Eggert, & Sascha Benecken)
 December 2 & 3, 2017: TRLWC #2 in  Altenberg
 Winners:  (Natalie Geisenberger, Felix Loch, Toni Eggert, & Sascha Benecken)
 December 8 & 9, 2017: TRLWC #3 in  Calgary
 Winners:  (Tatjana Hüfner, Felix Loch, Toni Eggert, & Sascha Benecken)
 January 6 & 7: TRLWC #4 in  Schönau am Königsee
 Winners:  (Andrea Vötter, Dominik Fischnaller, Ivan Nagler, & Fabian Malleier)
 January 13 & 14: TRLWC #5 in  Oberhof
 Winners:  (Dajana Eitberger, Felix Loch, Toni Eggert, & Sascha Benecken)
 January 27 & 28: TRLWC #6 (final) in  Sigulda
 Winners:  (Tatiana Ivanova, Semen Pavlichenko, Alexander Denisyev, & Vladislav Antonov)

2017–18 Sprint Luge World Cup
 November 25 & 26, 2017: SLWC #1 in  Winterberg
 Men's singles:  Felix Loch
 Women's singles:  Emily Sweeney
 Men's doubles:  (Tobias Wendl & Tobias Arlt)
 December 15 & 16, 2017: SLWC #2 in  Lake Placid
 Men's singles:  Wolfgang Kindl
 Women's singles:  Dajana Eitberger
 Men's doubles:  (Toni Eggert & Sascha Benecken)
 January 20 & 21: SLWC #2 in  Lillehammer
 Men's singles:  Semen Pavlichenko
 Women's singles:  Summer Britcher
 Men's doubles:  (Peter Penz & Georg Fischler)
 January 27 & 28: SLWC #3 (final) in  Sigulda
 Men's singles:  Roman Repilov
 Women's singles:  Tatiana Ivanova
 Men's doubles:  (Toni Eggert & Sascha Benecken)

2017–18 Natural Track Luge World Cup
 December 2 & 3, 2017: NTLWC #1 in  Kühtai
 Men's singles:  Thomas Kammerlander
 Women's singles:  Greta Pinggera
 Men's doubles:  (Patrick Pigneter & Florian Clara)
 January 5 – 7: NTLWC #2 in  Latzfons
 Men's singles:  Patrick Pigneter
 Women's singles:  Evelin Lanthaler
 Men's doubles:  (Patrick Pigneter & Florian Clara)
 January 11 – 14: NTLWC #3 in  Passeiertal
 Men's singles:  Alex Gruber
 Women's singles:  Evelin Lanthaler
 Men's doubles:  (Patrick Pigneter & Florian Clara)
 January 19 – 21: NTLWC #4 in  Saint Sebastian
 Men's singles:  Thomas Kammerlander
 Women's singles:  Evelin Lanthaler
 Men's doubles:  (Patrick Pigneter & Florian Clara)
 January 26 – 28: NTLWC #5 in  Deutschnofen
 Men's singles:  Alex Gruber
 Women's singles:  Greta Pinggera
 Men's doubles:  (Rupert Brueggler & Tobias Angerer)
 February 15 – 17: NTLWC #6 (final) in  Umhausen
 Men's singles:  Thomas Kammerlander
 Women's singles:  Evelin Lanthaler
 Men's doubles:  (Patrick Pigneter & Florian Clara)

Speed skating

2018 Winter Olympics (Speed skating)
 February 10 – 22: Short track speed skating at the 2018 Winter Olympics in  Pyeongchang
 Men's 500 m winners:   Wu Dajing (WR);   Hwang Dae-heon;   Lim Hyo-jun
 Women's 500 m winners:   Arianna Fontana;   Yara van Kerkhof;   Kim Boutin
 Men's 1000 m winners:   Samuel Girard;   John-Henry Krueger;   Seo Yi-ra
 Women's 1000 m winners:   Suzanne Schulting;   Kim Boutin;   Arianna Fontana
 Men's 1500 m winners:   Lim Hyo-jun;   Sjinkie Knegt;   Semion Elistratov
 Women's 1500 m winners:   Choi Min-jeong;   Li Jinyu;   Kim Boutin
 Men's 5000 m Relay winners:   (OR);  ;  
 Women's 3000 m Relay winners:  ;  ;  
 February 10 – 24: Speed skating at the 2018 Winter Olympics in  Pyeongchang
 Men's 500 m winners:   Håvard Holmefjord Lorentzen (OR);   Cha Min-kyu;   Gao Tingyu
 Women's 500 m winners:   Nao Kodaira (OR);   Lee Sang-hwa;   Karolína Erbanová
 Men's 1000 m winners:   Kjeld Nuis;   Håvard Holmefjord Lorentzen;   Kim Tae-yun
 Women's 1000 m winners:   Jorien ter Mors (OR);   Nao Kodaira;   Miho Takagi
 Men's 1500 m winners:   Kjeld Nuis;   Patrick Roest;   Kim Min-seok
 Women's 1500 m winners:   Ireen Wüst;   Miho Takagi;   Marrit Leenstra
 Women's 3000 m winners:   Carlijn Achtereekte;   Ireen Wüst;   Antoinette de Jong
 Men's 5000 m winners:   Sven Kramer (OR);   Ted-Jan Bloemen;   Sverre Lunde Pedersen
 Women's 5000 m winners:   Esmee Visser;   Martina Sáblíková;   Natalya Voronina
 Men's 10000 m winners:   Ted-Jan Bloemen (OR);   Jorrit Bergsma;   Nicola Tumolero
 Men's Mass Start winners:   Lee Seung-hoon;   Bart Swings;   Koen Verweij
 Women's Mass Start winners:   Nana Takagi;   Kim Bo-reum;   Irene Schouten
 Men's Team Pursuit winners:  ;  ;  
 Women's Team Pursuit winners:   (OR);  ;

2017–18 ISU Speed Skating World Cup
 November 10 – 12, 2017: SSWC #1 in  Heerenveen
 500 m #1 winners:  Håvard Holmefjord Lorentzen (m) /  Nao Kodaira (f)
 500 m #2 winners:  Laurent Dubreuil (m) /  Nao Kodaira (f)
 1000 m winners:  Pavel Kulizhnikov (m) /  Nao Kodaira (f)
 1500 m winners:  Denis Yuskov (m) /  Miho Takagi (f)
 Men's 5000 m winner:  Sven Kramer
 Women's 3000 m winner:  Antoinette de Jong
 Team Pursuit winners:  (m) /  (f)
 Team Sprint winners:  (m) /  (f)
 Mass Start winners:  Lee Seung-hoon (m) /  Ayano Sato (f)
 November 17 – 19, 2017: SSWC #2 in  Stavanger
 500 m #1 winners:  Håvard Holmefjord Lorentzen (m) /  Nao Kodaira (f)
 500 m #2 winners:  Ronald Mulder (m) /  Nao Kodaira (f)
 1000 m winners:  Håvard Holmefjord Lorentzen (m) /  Nao Kodaira (f)
 1500 m winners:  Sverre Lunde Pedersen (m) /  Miho Takagi (f)
 Men's 10,000 m winner:  Sven Kramer
 Women's 5000 m winner:  Claudia Pechstein
 Team Sprint winners:  (m) (World Record) /  (f)
 December 1 – 3, 2017: SSWC #3 in  Calgary
 500 m winners:  Alex Boisvert-Lacroix (m) /  Nao Kodaira (f)
 1000 m winners:  Kai Verbij (m) /  Heather Bergsma (f)
 1500 m winners:  Denis Yuskov (m) /  Miho Takagi (f)
 Men's 5000 m winner:  Sven Kramer
 Women's 3000 m winner:  Miho Takagi
 Team Pursuit winners:  (m) /  (f)
 Team Sprint winners:  (m) /  (f)
 Mass Start winners:  Andrea Giovannini (m) /  Claudia Pechstein (f)
 December 8 – 10, 2017: SSWC #4 in  Salt Lake City
 500 m #1 winners:  Alex Boisvert-Lacroix (m) /  Nao Kodaira (f)
 500 m #2 winners:  Ruslan Murashov (m) /  Nao Kodaira (f)
 1000 m winners:  Denis Yuskov (m) /  Nao Kodaira (f)
 1500 m winners:  Denis Yuskov (m) /  Miho Takagi (f)
 Men's 5000 m winner:  Ted-Jan Bloemen
 Women's 3000 m winner:  Natalya Voronina
 Team Pursuit winners:  (m) /  (f)
 Mass Start winners:  Lee Seung-hoon (m) /  Francesca Lollobrigida (f)
 January 19 – 21: SSWC #5 in  Erfurt
 500 m #1 winners:  Pavel Kulizhnikov (m) /  Karolína Erbanová (f)
 500 m #2 winners:  Håvard Holmefjord Lorentzen (m) /  Vanessa Herzog (f)
 1000 m #1 winners:  Kjeld Nuis (m) /  Jorien ter Mors (f)
 1000 m #2 winners:  Kjeld Nuis (m) /  Vanessa Herzog (f)
 1500 m winners:  Denis Yuskov (m) /  Ireen Wüst (f)
 Men's 5000 m winner:  Sverre Lunde Pedersen
 Women's 3000 m winner:  Ivanie Blondin
 March 17 & 18: SSWC #6 (final) in  Minsk
 500 m #1 winners:  Hein Otterspeer (m) /  Karolína Erbanová (f)
 500 m #2 winners:  Jan Smeekens (m) /  Angelina Golikova (f)
 1000 m winners:  Kjeld Nuis (m) /  Marrit Leenstra (f)
 1500 m winners:  Sverre Lunde Pedersen (m) /  Miho Takagi (f)
 Men's 5000 m winner:  Sverre Lunde Pedersen
 Women's 3000 m winner:  Antoinette de Jong
 Team Pursuit winners:  (m) /  (f)
 Team Sprint winners:  (m) /  (f)
 Mass Start winners:  Simon Schouten (m) /  Ayano Sato (f)

Other long track speed skating events
 January 5 – 7: 2018 European Speed Skating Championships in  Kolomna
 500 m winners:  Ronald Mulder (m) /  Vanessa Herzog (f)
 1000 m winners:  Pavel Kulizhnikov (m) /  Yekaterina Shikhova (f)
 1500 m winners:  Denis Yuskov (m) /  Lotte van Beek (f)
 Women's 3000 m winner:  Esmee Visser
 Men's 5000 m winner:  Nicola Tumolero
 Team Pursuit winners:  (m) /  (f)
 Team Sprint winners:  (m) /  (f)
 Mass Start winners:  Jan Blokhuijsen (m) /  Francesca Lollobrigida (f)
 March 3 & 4: 2018 ISU World Sprint Speed Skating Championships in  Changchun
 500 m winners:  Håvard Holmefjord Lorentzen (m; 2 times) /  Nao Kodaira (f; 2 times)
 1000 m winners:  Kjeld Nuis (m; 2 times) /  Jorien ter Mors (f; 2 times)
 March 9 – 11: 2018 ISU World Allround Speed Skating Championships in  Amsterdam
 500 m winners:  Patrick Roest (m) /  Miho Takagi
 1500 m winners:  Sverre Lunde Pedersen (m) /  Miho Takagi (f)
 5000 m winners:  Sverre Lunde Pedersen (m) /  Ireen Wüst (f)
 Men's 10,000 m winner:  Nils van der Poel
 Women's 3000 m winner:  Ireen Wüst
 Overall winners:  Patrick Roest (m) /  Miho Takagi (f)
 March 21 – 25: 2018 World University Speed Skating Championship in  Minsk
 500 m winners:  Tatsuya Shinhama (m) /  Miku Asano (f)
 1000 m winners:  Tatsuya Shinhama (m) /  Rio Yamada (f)
 1500 m winners:  Ivan Arzhanikov (m) /  Rio Yamada (f)
 5000 m winners:  Davide Ghiotto (m) /  Magdalena Czyszczon (f)
 Men's 10,000 m winner:  Davide Ghiotto
 Women's 3000 m winner:  Magdalena Czyszczon
 Team Pursuit winners:  (m) /  (f)
 Team Sprint winners:  (m) /  (f)
 Mass Start winners:  Ignat Golovatsiuk (m) /  Magdalena Czyszczon (f)

2017–18 ISU Short Track Speed Skating World Cup
 September 28 – October 1, 2017: STWC #1 in  Budapest at BOK Hall
 500 m winners:  Sándor Liu Shaolin (m) /  Choi Min-jeong (f)
 1000 m winners:  LIM Hyo-jun (m) /  Choi Min-jeong (f)
 1500 m winners:  LIM Hyo-jun (m) /  Choi Min-jeong (f)
 Men's 5000 m Relay winners:  (Charles Hamelin, Charle Cournoyer, Samuel Girard, and Pascal Dion)
 Women's 3000 m Relay winners:  (Shim Suk-hee, Kim A-lang, Choi Min-jeong, and KIM Ye-jin)
 Team Classification:  (m) /  (f)
 October 5 – 8, 2017: STWC #2 in  Dordrecht at the Sportboulevard
 500 m winners:  Samuel Girard (m) /  Marianne St-Gelais (f)
 1000 m winners:  Sjinkie Knegt (m) /  Shim Suk-hee (f)
 1500 m winners:  HWANG Dae-heon (m) /  Choi Min-jeong (f)
 Men's 5000 m winners:  (Samuel Girard, Charles Hamelin, Charle Cournoyer, and Pascal Dion)
 Women's 3000 m winners:  (ZANG Yize, Han Yutong, Fan Kexin, and Zhou Yang)
 Team Classification:  (m) /  (f)
 November 9 – 12, 2017: STWC #3 in  Shanghai at the Oriental Sports Center
 500 m winners:  Wu Dajing (m) /  Kim Boutin (f)
 1000 m winners:  Wu Dajing (m) /  Kim Boutin (f)
 1500 m winners:  HWANG Dae-heon (m) /  Shim Suk-hee (f)
 Men's 5000 m winners:  (Thomas Insuk Hong, J. R. Celski, John-Henry Krueger, and Keith Carroll) (World Record)
 Women's 3000 m winners:  (Choi Min-jeong, Shim Suk-hee, KIM Ye-jin, and LEE Yu-bin)
 Team Classification:  (m) /  (f)
 November 16 – 19, 2017: STWC #4 (final) in  Seoul at the Mokdong Icerink
 500 m winners:  Wu Dajing (m) /  Elise Christie (f)
 1000 m winners:  Sándor Liu Shaolin (m) /  Choi Min-jeong (f)
 1500 m winners:  Charles Hamelin (m) /  Choi Min-jeong (f)
 Men's 5000 m winners:  (KIM Do-kyoum, LIM Hyo-jun, SEO Yi-ra, & Kwak Yoon-gy 
 Women's 3000 m winners:  (Suzanne Schulting, Rianne de Vries, Yara van Kerkhof, & Lara van Ruijven)
 Team Classification:  (m) /  (f)

Other short track speed skating events
 January 12 – 14: 2018 European Short Track Speed Skating Championships in  Dresden
 500 m winners:  Sjinkie Knegt (m) /  Martina Valcepina (f)
 1000 m winners:  Sjinkie Knegt (m) /  Arianna Fontana (f)
 1500 m winners:  Sjinkie Knegt (m) /  Martina Valcepina (f)
 3000 m SF winners:  Vladislav Bykanov (m) /  Sofia Prosvirnova (f)
 Women's 3000 m relay winners:  (Tatiana Borodulina, Emina Malagich, Sofia Prosvirnova, & Ekaterina Efremenkova)
 Men's 5000 m relay winners:  (Daan Breeuwsma, Sjinkie Knegt, Itzhak de Laat, & Dennis Visser)
 Overall classification:  Sjinkie Knegt (m) /  Arianna Fontana (f)
 March 16 – 18: 2018 World Short Track Speed Skating Championships in  Montreal
 500 m winners:  Hwang Dae-heon (m) /  Choi Min-jeong (f)
 1000 m winners:  Charles Hamelin (m) /  Shim Suk-hee (f)
 1500 m winners:  Charles Hamelin (m) /  Choi Min-jeong (f)
 3000 m SF winners:  Shaolin Sándor Liu (m) /  Choi Min-jeong (f)
 Women's 3000 m relay winners:  (Shim Suk-hee, Kim A-lang, Choi Min-jeong, & Kim Ye-jin)
 Men's 5000 m relay winners:  (Kwak Yoon-gy, Kim Do-kyoum, Hwang Dae-heon, & Lim Hyo-jun)
 Overall classification:  Charles Hamelin (m) /  Choi Min-jeong (f)

See also
 2018 in skiing
 2018 in sports

References

External links
 Federation of International Bandy
 International Bobsleigh and Skeleton Federation
 World Curling Federation
 International Skating Union
 International Ice Hockey Federation
 International Luge Federation

Ice sports
Ice sports
Ice sports by year
2018 sport-related lists